The National Department of Mineral Production (DNPM) is a Brazilian federal agency under the Ministry of Mines and Energy, with headquarters in Brasilia, Distrito Federal, district and throughout the national territory, with representation by superintendents and police stations.

Fossils
The Decree-Law No. 4,146 of 1942 gave the DNPM the power to regulate and supervise the fossils in Brazil.

See also
 Paleorrota

References

Government agencies of Brazil